Mary Washington (November 30, 1708 – August 26, 1789), was the second wife of Augustine Washington, a planter in Virginia, the mother-in-law of Martha Washington, the paternal grandmother of Bushrod Washington, and the mother of George Washington, the first president of the United States, and five other children. Washington lived a large part of her life in Fredericksburg, Virginia, where many monuments were erected in her honor and a university plus other public buildings bear her name.

Early life

Mary Ball was born November 30, 1708 at either Epping Forest, her family's plantation in Lancaster County, Virginia or at a plantation near the village of Simonson, Virginia. She was the only child of Col. Joseph Ball (1649–1711) and his second wife, Mary Johnson Ball. Joseph was born in England and emigrated to Virginia as a child. Fatherless at three and orphaned at twelve, Mary Ball was placed under the guardianship of George Eskridge, a lawyer, in accordance with the terms of her mother's will, for whom her son George Washington, was named, consistent with the naming conventions at the time. (See the appendix of the book Albion's Seed by David Hackett Fischer for an insightful discussion of four naming conventions in use at the time in Great Britain.) Her paternal grandfather was William Ball (1615 – c. 1680); he left England for Virginia in the 1650s. His wife Hannah Atherold arrived later along with their four children, including Mary's father Joseph.

Married life

Augustine Washington had sailed to Britain on business (and to visit his sons who had been sent to school there) but on his return, he discovered that his first wife, Jane Butler Washington, had died in the interim. George Eskridge supposedly arranged an introduction between his friend, Washington, and his ward Mary Ball, with the two marrying on March 6, 1731 when she was 22. She was wealthy by the standards of the day and brought at least 1000 acres of inherited property to the marriage. The couple had the following children:

 George Washington (1732–1799), the first president of the United States, who married Martha Dandridge
 Elizabeth "Betty" Washington (1733–1797), who married Fielding Lewis
 Samuel Washington (1734–1781), who married five times
 John Augustine Washington (1736–1787), who married Hannah Bushrod
 Charles Washington (1738–1799), who married Mildred Thornton
 Mildred Washington (1739–1740), who died young.

Augustine died in 1743 when son George was 11 years old. On his deathbed, "Gus" gave his son George three books on prayer. In some of those books, now in the Lyceum in Boston, Mary Ball Washington, also wrote her name. Unlike most widows in Virginia at the time, Mary Ball Washington never remarried. When George was 14, his older half-brother Lawrence Washington, who commanded a unit of Virginia Militia that served on board with British Admiral Edward Vernon, for whom Mount Vernon was named, arranged for young George to become a British Navy Midshipman. However, Mary's highly respected half-brother, Joseph Ball, under whom the Virginia House of Burgesses had voted money to pay the cost for Virginia's young men to go study for the ministry, wrote a reply to her letter requesting advice, wherein he said do not allow your son George to join the British Navy, for they will "...treat him worse than a slave or a dog."

Mary managed the family estate and 276 acres of Ferry Farm (a plantation) with the help of others until her eldest son came of age and well beyond. She lived to see that her son, George Washington, commanded the Continental Army to independence and was inaugurated as the first president of the United States in 1789. After learning that he had been elected president in April 1789, George Washington traveled from Mount Vernon to visit his mother in Fredericksburg. He was accompanied by Martha Washington's grandson George Washington Parke Custis. George Washington knew his Mother was ill. She was suffering from breast cancer, the disease to which she eventually succumbed, but, he sought her blessing as he embarked on another service to his Country: the new concept of "The Presidency of the United States."

Here, as popularly told, the stories and lore—probably begun and perpetuated by Custis—take over. It is said that Mrs. Washington informed her son of her poor health and expected to die soon. Further, the story continues, that her son George said that he would need to decline to serve as president. George's mother Mary responded, saying, "But go, George, fulfill the high destinies which Heaven appears to have intended for you for; go, my son, and may that Heaven's and a mother's blessing be with you always." This purely legendary account is frequently cited as true, but cannot be verified.

What can be documented is that he received her approval and, of course, left Fredericksburg and made his way to New York City, where he was inaugurated at the end of April.

Death
After a lengthy illness, on August 25, 1789, Mary Ball Washington died of breast cancer at her home in Fredericksburg, Virginia.

Beliefs
While there is a legend that Mrs. Washington was said to be openly opposed to her son's revolutionary politics and, according to French officers based in Virginia during the war, she was a Loyalist sympathizer, there is no credible source to support that legend. The facts are that other than her son George who was Commander in Chief of the Continental forces (Army and Navy), Mary's other three sons Samuel, John Augustine, and Charles, all served in the Virginia Militia. Her son-in-law Fielding Lewis (husband to her daughter Betty), was in charge of the Fredericksburg Gunnery or Gun Manufactory. The gunnery works made muskets for use by American Revolutionary forces, and ended up almost bankrupting Lewis in the process.

Mary Washington was by no means poor despite the fact that she petitioned the Government of Virginia claiming, in response to a Virginia government notice to citizens to do so, asking to be reimbursed for farm animals, horses and cattle that she gave to support the American war effort. Her son, George, purchased her a fine house in Fredericksburg, four blocks from some "Prayer Rocks" Mary frequented to pray for her children and only two blocks from Kenmore, where George's sister Betty (Mrs. Fielding Lewis) lived. Mary lived in her home nearby from 1772 until her death in 1789, but George also arranged for water from the "medicine springs" on the Ferry Farm property, her home for many years, to be brought to his mother in town each day. In her will, Mary Washington left George the majority of her lands and appointed him as her executor.

Mary Washington frequently visited her daughter Elizabeth "Betty" and her husband Fielding Lewis at their Kenmore Plantation two blocks from her home in Fredericksburg. She had a favorite "prayer rock" that was close to the Lewis mansion. Tradition has it that this was her favorite retreat for reading and prayer. She asked Betty to bury her there after her death, and her daughter arranged that.

Descendants
Her third son, John Augustine Washington, was the father of Bushrod Washington, who was nominated by President John Adams to the U.S. Supreme Court, and confirmed by the Senate in 1798, while his Uncle George was living in retirement at Mount Vernon. Charles Town, West Virginia, is named for her fourth son, Charles Washington. The national capital and many other cities, towns and villages are named "Washington" for her first son, George Washington.

Legacy and honors
Several monuments have been erected to Mary Ball Washington in Fredericksburg, Virginia, where she lived from 1772 until her death in 1789.
The Mary Washington House in Fredericksburg has been preserved by Preservation Virginia (formerly known as the Association for the Preservation of Virginia Antiquities) who, in mid-2012, signed an agreement passing ownership to the "Washington Heritage Museums." The residence is open to the public and operated as a historic house museum. It contains a fine collection of antique furnishings, some with Washington family provenance.
Mary Ball Washington is buried on the grounds of Kenmore, the former home of her daughter and son-in-law Fielding and Betty Lewis. Kenmore is operated as a house museum and is open regularly for public tours.
A monument to Mary Ball Washington was erected in 1833 and dedicated by President Andrew Jackson. It was left unfinished until the National Society Daughters of the American Revolution, a women's organization formed in the late nineteenth century raised money for the monument. The Mary Washington Memorial Association used social events and balls to raise money for the cause. The new memorial was dedicated by President Grover Cleveland in 1894 at her grave site. 
The University of Mary Washington, a public university in Fredericksburg, Virginia, was named for her.
The Mary Washington Hospital, located in Fredericksburg, is named for her.
In November 2019, the Fredericksburg Nationals minor league baseball team introduced a Mary Washington logo at an event at the Mary Washington House on her 311th birthday, describing the logo as "the first female logo in baseball history to be a part of a team's permanent and original branding."

See also
 Mary Washington House
 St. Mary's, Whitechapel
 Mary Ball Washington Museum and Library
 The SS Mary Ball was a World War II Liberty ship.
 Washington family

Notes

Further reading

External links

His "Revered Mother" at HistoryPoint.org
The Mary Washington House on the APVA Preservation Virginia website
Oh, Mother! -
The Life and Legacy of the "Grandmother of our Country"

1700s births
1789 deaths
18th-century American Episcopalians
British North American Anglicans
Colonial American women
Mothers of presidents of the United States
People from Fredericksburg, Virginia
People from Lancaster County, Virginia
People from Spotsylvania County, Virginia
Virginia colonial people
Mary Ball
American people of English descent